The Little Black River is a  stream in Cheboygan County in the U.S. state of Michigan.

Tributaries
(from the mouth)
 (left) South Branch Little Black River
 (left) West Branch Little Black River

See also
List of rivers of Michigan

References

Rivers of Michigan
Rivers of Cheboygan County, Michigan
Tributaries of Lake Huron